West Monroe is a national management and technology consulting firm headquartered in Chicago, United States.
 West Monroe provides professional consulting services to businesses across many industries, including consumer and industrial products, energy and utilities, financial services, healthcare, life sciences, private equity, retail, and software and high tech. All employees share equity as part of the firm's employee stock ownership plan (ESOP).

Office locations 

West Monroe has eight offices in North America, including Chicago (headquarters), Dallas, Los Angeles, Minneapolis, New York City, San Francisco, Seattle,Washington, D.C., and one in the U.K. London.

History

2002–2004: formative years 

In April 2002, four former Arthur Andersen consultants met at Miller’s Pub in Chicago and founded West Monroe. That group, which included Dean Fischer (chairman of the board emeritus) and Kevin McCarty (currently CEO and chairman of the board), established West Monroe Partners LLC, with the name deriving from Arthur Andersen's previous address on West Monroe Street in Chicago. Dean Fischer became the company's first president and CEO.

The firm began serving its first client, Equity Marketing Services, in June 2002, and went on to deliver business and technology consulting services to a variety of mostly Midwestern clients from its Chicago office.  In mid-2004, West Monroe hired its 50th employee and launched its first website.

2005–2009: expansion years 

The years between 2005 and the end of the decade marked a period of expansion for West Monroe. In 2005, the firm opened three new offices in Montreal (January), Seattle (October), and Columbus, Ohio (December).  During this year, the firm reached $10 million in revenue and hired its 100th employee, including members of West Monroe's first university recruiting class.  In 2006, the National Association for Business Resources named West Monroe one of its “101 Best and Brightest Companies to Work For” in Chicago. Since then, it has garnered similar accolades locally in Chicago, Seattle, and Columbus, as well as nationally from Consulting Magazine and Vault.

Expansion continued with the mid-2006 opening of a Toronto office and merger with LxLi, a consulting firm specializing in labor management and engineered labor standards.  In 2007, West Monroe opened an office in New York City (April) and one in Dallas (September).

West Monroe established in 2007 a formal, 13-member Board of Managers. During this period, the firm started practices to serve specific industries; for example, the Energy & Utilities practice, which has worked with utilities across the country to plan and advance smart-grid strategies. During the latter years of the decade, West Monroe also began to focus on multi-faceted business transformations. The same year, West Monroe also welcomed its first intern class. All five members of the inaugural intern class are still at the firm today.

2010–2017 

In March 2010, West Monroe entered an international consulting alliance with BearingPoint, which has strong European roots.

In April 2012, West Monroe celebrated its tenth anniversary in business. Later that year, in September, it named co-founder Kevin McCarty as president. Dean Fischer retains the role of CEO. The firm added an office in Minneapolis in late 2012.

At the end of 2012, West Monroe reorganized as an employee stock ownership plan.

In January 2014, West Monroe announced it had acquired Madrona Solutions Group, a Seattle-based consulting firm focused on delivering customer relationship management and business intelligence. The same month it also announced the opening of its Los Angeles, CA office.

In October 2014, president and co-founder Kevin McCarty was named as CEO. He replaced Dean Fischer, who retired and transitioned to the role of executive chairman of the board of managers.

In October 2015, West Monroe announced it had acquired Etherios, a Salesforce platform. As part of the acquisition, the firm strengthened its presence in two markets, San Francisco, CA and Dallas, TX.

In July 2016, West Monroe announced it had acquired Invoyent, a Chicago-based healthcare consulting firm.

2017–present 

In 2017, West Monroe announced the acquisition of CAST Management Consultants, a financial services consulting firm based in Los Angeles.
 
In 2018, West Monroe added two new members to its Board of Managers, Barbara Duganier and Barbara Bennett, bringing the total number of outside board members to three.

In the fall of 2018, West Monroe met a new headcount milestone, exceeding 1,000 employees.

In January 2019, West Monroe invested in an expanded leadership team by promoting three executives to newly formed C-level positions.

In 2019, West Monroe acquired two companies: Waterstone Management Group, an advisory firm for private equity firms and Fortune 500 companies; and GoKart Labs, a digital product studio. The two transactions expanded West Monroe’s capabilities in software, high-tech, and digital transformation.

In October 2019, West Monroe signed a 12-year lease as the anchor tenant at 311 W. Monroe in Chicago’s Loop neighborhood. As the anchor tenant, West Monroe has naming rights and will call the building West Monroe HQ.

In 2020, West Monroe acquired two companies: Pace Harmon, a strategy and outsourcing firm; and Two Six Capital, a data science firm for private equity.

In September 2021, West Monroe acquired Verys, a California-based software development firm. The acquisition represents their largest to date, and was a part of a "$250 million investment in continuing to build its end-to-end digital services in response to unprecedented client demand."

Global alliance 

In 2010, West Monroe announced a strategic consulting alliance with BearingPoint to expand their global market coverage and to better provide services to their international clients. Both firms offer business consulting services to help solve their clients’ most important and broader business issues. While BearingPoint has European roots, West Monroe is active in the North American management consulting market.

Industry specialization 

West Monroe maintains specialized capabilities in the following industries:

 Financial services
 Human Capital Management
 Private equity 
 Healthcare 
 Life Sciences
 Energy and Utilities
 Manufacturing and Distribution
 Retail
 Software and High Tech

Competitors 

West Monroe Partners’ competitors range from niche consulting firms with specific industry, functional, and technical expertise to the largest global management and technology consulting firms.

Recruiting 

West Monroe has a team of more than 1500 professionals with diverse skills: strategic and tactical, business and technology, functional and process, industry and market focused. It recruits a mix of experienced personnel (approximately 67 percent of new hires) and entry-level consultants (approximately 33 percent of new hires).

The firm uses a variety of methods to source talent, including employee referrals, social media and networking, staffing partnerships, and campus activities.

Awards and recognition 

West Monroe is consistently named as a best place to work by publications such as Great Place to Work and Fortune Magazine, Consulting magazine, Puget Sound Business Journal, Crain’s Chicago Business, Crain’s New York, Dallas Business Journal, and Minneapolis/St. Paul Business Journal.

Publishing 

West Monroe publishes a monthly newsletter for clients, as well as several industry-specific newsletters. These ongoing newsletters highlight key industry trends and issues facing C-level executives.

In addition, West Monroe authors multiple research studies and polls, white papers, perspectives, executive communications, and newsletters on a variety of topics.

References

Consulting firms established in 2002